"I've Got to Use My Imagination" is a song recorded by Gladys Knight & the Pips. Released from the hit album, Imagination, which was their debut album with Buddah Records. It was a success on the soul and pop charts, spending a week at number one on the Hot Soul Singles chart in early 1974 and peaking at number four on the Billboard Hot 100. It became one of the band's highest charting songs and eventually sold more than one million copies.

On the television series A Different World, Whitley, Jaleesa and another classmate perform the song to audition to sing backup for Gladys Knight (who made a special guest appearance on the show).

The song has been covered by such artists as Joan Osborne, Professor RJ Ross, Bobby Bland, Joe Cocker and The Rides. Ian Moss recorded a version for his sixth studio album, Soul on West 53rd (2009).

Charts

References

External links
[ Song Review] on AllMusic

1973 singles
1973 songs
Gladys Knight & the Pips songs
Songs with lyrics by Gerry Goffin
Songs written by Barry Goldberg